The Egyptian Gazette is an English-language Egyptian daily, part of El Tahrir Printing and Publishing House.

First published on 26 January 1880, it is the oldest English-language newspaper in the Middle East.

Eyad Abu El Haggag is chairman of the Gazette's board and Mohamed Fahmy has been the editor-in-chief since Sept. 27, 2020.

History
The Egyptian Gazette was  founded in 1880 as a four-page weekly tabloid in Alexandria by five Britons, including Andrew Philip, as editor, and Moberly Bell, later managing editor of The Times in London.

In the 1930s, Cairo became more important than Alexandria as a news centre and the newspaper's offices were moved to the Egyptian capital on 20 February 1938.

Shortly before World War II, ownership of The Egyptian Gazette passed to the Société Orientale de Publicité (SOP), in which Oswald J. Finney, a wealthy British businessman, was the major shareholder. The Egyptian Gazette found itself associated with The Egyptian Mail, another English-language Egyptian newspaper, founded in 1914, and also owned by the SOP. The market was split between the two dailies, with the Mail appearing in the morning, and the Gazette in the evening.

At the end of the war and with the departure of most of the British Army stationed in Egypt, the market for English-language newspapers shrank dramatically. As a result, and as continues to the present day, The Egyptian Gazette is published every day except Tuesdays, when the now-weekly The Egyptian Mail appears.

In May 1954, following the Egyptian Revolution of 1952 and the nationalization program of President Nasser, El Tahrir Printing and Publishing House took over ownership of the newspaper from the SOP. Amin Abul Enein was appointed managing editor, bringing the newspaper under the editorial authority of an Egyptian for the first time.

Editorship

References

External links
The Egyptian Gazette 
Digital Egyptian Gazette 

1880 establishments in Egypt
Daily newspapers published in Egypt
English-language newspapers published in Egypt
Mass media in Alexandria
Newspapers established in 1880
Newspapers published in Cairo